Alloteuthis africana, also known as the African squid, is a species of squid in the family Loliginidae. This species of squid is restricted to the Guinean province (from southern Morocco to southern Angola). To identify the Alloteuthis africana from other Alloteuthis congeners, it is highly recommended to measure the width of the squids head and the sucker size.

References

 Vecchione, M., E. Shea, S. Bussarawit, F. Anderson, D. Alexeyev, C.-C. Lu, T. Okutani, M. Roeleveld, C. Chotiyaputta, C. Roper, E. Jorgensen & N. Sukramongkol. (2005).  Phuket Marine Biological Center Research Bulletin 66: 23–26.

Squid
Molluscs of the Atlantic Ocean
Marine molluscs of Africa
Molluscs described in 1950